Fatima Jinnah Dental College, commonly referred to by the acronym FJDC, is the oldest dental school in Karachi and one of the oldest in Pakistan. Established in 1992, it is run and managed by a duly registered Fatima Jinnah Dental College & Hospital Trust. It offers students a four-year undergraduate program leading to a degree of Bachelor of Dental Sciences (BDS) in addition to sponsoring graduate students to post-graduate qualification of M.S., MPhil and Ph.D.

The college is affiliated with Jinnah Sindh Medical University and is recognized by the Pakistan Medical and Dental Council (PMDC). It is also recognised for post-graduation by College of Physicians & Surgeons Pakistan. The college is named after Fatima Jinnah, sister of the founder of the nation, Mohammad Ali Jinnah, who was herself a dentist, and to pay homage to the services she offered to the country.

History
FJDC was established against the backdrop of a disastrous dental scenario in 1992, during which the dentist-to-population ratio of 1 dentist to nearly 85,000 people was one of the lowest in the world. In 1993, there were just over 1,200 registered dentists in Pakistan compared to 70,000 medical doctors, serving a population of well over 100 million.

Therefore, in 1989, Baqar Askary, then the president of the Dow Medical College Students' Union and President National Students Federation, launched a campaign for the establishment of a dental college to serve the over 12 million people of Karachi. The aim initially was to persuade the Federal Government and the Provincial Government of Sindh to establish a dental college attached to one of the existing medical colleges in the city, specifically either the Jinnah Post-Graduate Medical Centre, Sindh Medical College, Dow Medical College, or Civil Hospital as dental departments already existed in these institutions.

However, by mid 1989 it was made clear that the government had no intention of establishing a dental college at Karachi, but the Federal Government of Pakistan, did however, as a consolation, announced later that year, that it will allow such an institution to be established in the private sector.

Thereafter, with the intimation to the Federal Government, Provincial Ministries for Health, The Pakistan Medical and Dental Council and the University of Karachi, and with all other necessary documentation, the college finally begun its first academic session in the year 1992-93. The college officials consider it significant that year 1993 was  also the centenary year of the birth of Fatima Jinnah, in whose memory the college was established, and therefore consider the college as a "gift to the Nation" on that occasion.

Location and facilities

Pre-clinical campus

The college had its basic sciences section for the first and second professional years housed in a private building until August 2000, when the college was permanently shifted to its permanent custom built campus in Shah Abdul Latif Bhittai Colony in Korangi Creek Cantonment Area on the outskirts of Karachi.

However, the campus is found wanting in some of the more basic requirements of an educational institution. For instance, there are no separate common rooms for girls or boys, and only one of the two lecture halls, is big enough to keep up with the growing number of students applying. With the number of students per batch increasing every year, the need to expand this campus will become more serious in the near future.

Clinical campus
The third and fourth professional years are taught and trained at the Fatima Jinnah Dental Hospital located at Azam Basti, adjacent Phase-1 DHA. But again, these facilities may prove to be insufficient in the coming years, keeping in mind the growing number of students expected to apply in future years.

The hospital itself, however, is the busiest dental hospitals in the city. Since it caters primarily for the middle and lower class, patients are abundant, giving students vital exposure to various kinds of extensive dental procedures. This advantage is not always available to students from other dental colleges in the city, where the number of patients is far limited because of the greater cost of treatment. In addition to training at its own hospital students are also trained at the General Medicine and Surgery departments at the Rafiquee Shaheed Hospital in line with a 25-year agreement reached between the college officials and the city government.

Statutory and management affairs
The college is run by The Fatima Jinnah Dental College and Hospital Trust, which is a public, charitable, non-political, non-commercial Trust that was founded by the Late Syed Hashim Raza, a high-ranking civil servant and chair person. Manzoorudin Ahmed, former Vice Chancellor University of Karachi and an International Relations expert, is the Vice Chairman. Syed Ali Akhtar, an economist by profession, who has a wide range of experience in medical management and accounts is also one of the permanent trustees. Other trustees include a range of well-known personalities from both the private sector, as well as the government.

Founder trustees
 Manzooruddin Ahmed
 S. Baqar Askary
 Syed Hasan Naqvi
 Waheed Ahmed
 Khadim Hosain Siddiqui
 Mohammad Ibrahim Khorasani
 Ali Akhtar
 Syed Hashim Raza
 Naheed Askary

Permanent trustees
 Ghufran Ahmed
 Syed Hassan Askary
 Syed Hussain Askary

Associate trustees
 Asghar Mehdi
 Jahangir Abbas
 Ghause Mohammad
 Mr. S. M. Sibtain Ali

All income generated by the Trust is reinvested towards its maintenance and raising its standard. The fund generated majority of its income from students fee, though significant contributions also come from national and international funding agencies as well as well-wishing philanthropists, both from Pakistan and abroad. The financial affairs are conducted by Mr. S. Ali. Akhtar, who is also a Permanent Trustee and Director Finance of the college. The trust has been granted Tax Exemption under Section (1)(d) of the Income Tax Ordinance of 1979.

Faculty
The college has a diversified group of faculty members, including members having foreign qualifications. Apart from permanent, full-time faculty, the college also has on its rolls several visiting professors, from other private and state medical and dental colleges. Guests speakers from various walks of life and of various academic standing are also invited at regular intervals to deliver lectures and workshops ( & ) with a view to enhance specific and general knowledge of both the students and the faculty.

Academic standing

Undergraduate level
Since its inception, the college has performed extremely well in its B.D.S. program, regularly securing the top positions in the Karachi University supervised annual professional examinations (or 'profs'), together with a record number of distinctions in various subjects and an overall pass rate of 90%.

Its degree is accepted as a foreign qualification in most countries including the United Kingdom, U.S.A., U.A.E. & Germany. Graduates from this college are also entitled to appear in Professional and Linguistic Assessment Board Tests Examinations (U.K.) and the National & State Board Examinations of U.S.A. They can also directly enter post-graduate programs and take up internship and training positions in most countries. They also have access to short courses and hands-on workshops conducted by various universities and institutions internationally.

The Academic year is divided into semesters (whose numbers vary for students of different professional years) and teaching sessions, at the end of which an assessment is carried out to judge the performance of both the teachers and the students. At least once a year, invigilators and examinations are invited from outside the college's own faculty staff to conduct part of the overall assessment of the students.

Pre-BDS Foundation Course
Pre-BDS Foundation course, now a regular feature for every admitted student, first started in 2006, the project was developed and is being managed by a division of Institute named the Fatima Jinnah Foundation College (Fjfc). Dr. S. Hussain Askary, a graduate the seventh batch of FJDC, is its Project Director. The Foundation course was successfully culminated by an event of a very innovate style, named the First White Coat Ceremony which was heald on the 16th of December 2006. Students were presented with the symbolic white coats by seniors of the profession, after putting on the coats the students took, in unison, a pledge of professionalism. The successful students received certificates of completion, outstanding performers in academia and extracurricular activities received awards and cash prices.  The Ceremony along with marking the completion of the Pre-BDS program also commemorated sending up of the students to the first professional year of the BDS course. Family and friends of the entering class were also invited to join this special occasion. Over the years the Pre-Dental course has become a regular feature, it is not only well appreciated by the entering students but also give them an edge over students studying elsewhere.

Post-graduate level
The college offers a post-graduate program in Pakistan, in addition, the curriculum and training of the house officer, is being constantly expanded to allow fresh graduates to immediately take various foreign as well as national post-graduate examinations. Arrangements are also being made through a linkage program with Universities and Dental Colleges in the United Kingdom for on-job training in England under the Overseas Dentist Training Scheme. Arrangements are also underway with McGill University, Canada and the Loma Linda University Medical Center, U.S.A. for transfer of technology, exchange of faculty, assistance for post-graduation and research for residencies.

Admissions
Admissions are open to all persons of either sex and of whatsoever religion, race, creed or color who are academically qualified for admission to the courses of study offered by the college. A deliberate effort is usually made to select students from a diverse background. For local students, the minimum admission requirement is a Higher Secondary School Certificate (HSSC) issued in Pre-Medical subjects with minimum of 60% marks or IGSCE / GCSE / GCE plan in a minimum of 7 subjects and a minimum of Grade C for each subject; O-Level Science subjects and A-Level Physics, Chemistry and Biology are mandatory. Foreign students or holders of Secondary School Certificates other than GCSE apply through equivalence certificates.

References

External links
Fatima Jinnah Dental College - Official Website
Fatima Jinnah Dental College - Technology Partner
Fatima Jinnah Dental College & Hospital - Blog

Medical colleges in Sindh
Dental schools in Pakistan
University of Karachi
Universities and colleges in Karachi
Educational institutions established in 1992
1992 establishments in Pakistan